Ben William Hockenhull (born 3 September 2001) is an English professional footballer who plays as a central defender for Northern Premier League Premier Division club Warrington Rylands, on loan from  club Tranmere Rovers.

Hockenhull is a product of the Manchester United academy and began his professional career with Brentford, from whom he joined Tranmere Rovers in 2022.

Career

Manchester United 
A central defender, Hockenhull entered the Manchester United academy at age six and progressed to sign a scholarship in 2018. Despite having one year remaining on his scholarship, he departed Carrington in July 2020.

Brentford 
On 23 July 2020, Hockenhull transferred to the B team at Brentford on a two-year contract, with the option of a further year, for an undisclosed fee. After an injury-hit 2020–21 season spent acclimatising to the rigours of professional football, Hockenhull progressed during the early months of 2021–22 to training with the first team and at times, captaining the B team. He was a part of the B team's 2021–22 London Senior Cup-winning squad and transferred away from the club in May 2022. During two seasons with Brentford B, Hockenhull made 54 appearances and scored one goal.

Tranmere Rovers 
On 27 May 2022, Hockenhull signed a two-year contract with League Two club Tranmere Rovers, effective 10 June 2022. Hockenhull made his debut with a start in a 1–0 EFL Trophy group stage win over Crewe Alexandra on 18 October 2022, and three days later he joined Northern Premier League Premier Division club Warrington Rylands on a loan that was later extended until the end of the 2022–23 season.

Personal life 
Hockenhull is the son of former football manager Andy Hockenhull.

Career statistics

Playing style
Hockenhull has been described as an "imposing central defender" with "the ability to win the ball in the air, but is also a talented defender with the ball at his feet".

Honours 
Brentford B

 London Senior Cup: 2021–22

References

External links
Ben Hockenhull at tranmererovers.co.uk

Living people
2001 births
Sportspeople from Crewe
English footballers
Association football central defenders
Manchester United F.C. players
Brentford F.C. players
Tranmere Rovers F.C. players
Warrington Rylands 1906 F.C. players
Northern Premier League players